Josip "Jože" Primožič (7 February 1900, in Ljubljana – 18 August 1985, in Maribor) was a Yugoslavian gymnast of Slovene ethnicity.

He took part in three Olympic Games and three World Championships for Yugoslavia. This gave him a total of 10 medals, two silvers at the 1926 World Artistic Gymnastics Championships, four golds and a bronze at the 1930 World Artistic Gymnastics Championships, a bronze at the 1938 World Championships, as well as a silver and a bronze at the 1928 Olympics in Amsterdam.

At the 1924 Olympics, he won no medals, but Yugoslavia came in fourth in the team competition. In 1928, he also did well individually, and came in fifth in the individual overall competition. This came after many good placings in individual events; silver in the parallel bars, fourth on the flour, and sixth on the horizontal bars. There were also no medals in his last Olympics in 1936, and his best placing was sixth in the team event.

References

External links
 

  

1900 births
1985 deaths
Sportspeople from Ljubljana
Slovenian male artistic gymnasts
Yugoslav male artistic gymnasts
Olympic gymnasts of Yugoslavia
Olympic medalists in gymnastics
Olympic silver medalists for Yugoslavia
Olympic bronze medalists for Yugoslavia
Gymnasts at the 1924 Summer Olympics
Gymnasts at the 1928 Summer Olympics
Gymnasts at the 1936 Summer Olympics
Medalists at the 1928 Summer Olympics
Carniolan people